"Elizabeth" is a song by the Swedish rock band Ghost. The track was released as the lead single from the group's first studio album Opus Eponymous.

Background and release
The song "Elizabeth" is about Elizabeth Báthory. In 2010, the band produced a three-track demo and the vinyl-only single "Elizabeth", before releasing their first studio album, Opus Eponymous, on October 18, 2010.

Track listing

Personnel
 Papa Emeritus − vocals
 Nameless Ghouls – all instrumentalists: lead guitarist , bassist , keyboardist , drummer , rhythm guitarist

References

Ghost (Swedish band) songs
Songs about criminals
Cultural depictions of Elizabeth Báthory
2010 debut singles
2010 songs
Songs written by Tobias Forge